Paul Jason Barber (born 21 May 1955) is an English former field hockey player.

He was vice-captain of the gold winning Great Britain squad in the 1988 Summer Olympics in Seoul. Four years earlier he won Bronze at the 1984 Summer Olympics in Los Angeles. He also won silver with the England squad at the 1986 Hockey World Cup in London, and he scored the two goals in the semi-final that helped England defeat West Germany 2-1 and progress to the final.

In a career that spanned over 25 Years, Barber won 99 caps for England & 68 for Great Britain. A player of uncompromising physicality and determination, he was recognised as one of the finest defenders and short corner strikers in the world. In 1983 Barber was awarded UK Hockey Player of the Year. Following the 1988 tournament, in which he scored 5 goals, Barber retired from international hockey at all levels, and continued to play for Slough Hockey Club until the early 1990s when he joined Newbury & Thatcham Hockey Club. He played on for several more years until retiring from all forms of hockey in 1998.

Barber was born in Peterborough, Cambridgeshire, and went to The King's School. He resides in Bath with his wife, Jennie and has three sons, Michael, Stephen & Mark

References

External links
 
 

1955 births
Living people
English male field hockey players
English Olympic medallists
Olympic field hockey players of Great Britain
British male field hockey players
Field hockey players at the 1984 Summer Olympics
Field hockey players at the 1988 Summer Olympics
Olympic gold medallists for Great Britain
Olympic bronze medallists for Great Britain
People educated at The King's School, Peterborough
Olympic medalists in field hockey
Medalists at the 1988 Summer Olympics
Medalists at the 1984 Summer Olympics